Api Nodanna Live was a  (1 hour  in Season 1  & 1.1) (30-minute in Season2) Sri Lankan comedy sketch television show that was broadcast by Sirasa TV. It starred (the then relatively unknown) Gaminda Priyaviraj and Suneth Chithrananda as the characters Podi Malli and Chooti Malli. Both names connote younger brother. However, chooti usually has more emphasis, so Chooti Malli is probably to be considered the younger of the two characters.

Api Nodanna Live started in Dec 2002 and lasted up to early 2004. It was a hit at that time with the leading presenters of Podi Malli and Chooty Malli, and was supported by characters Sudu Malli and Jaya Sri.

The sequel, Api Nodanna Live season 2, was started on 18 February 2008 and telecasted every Saturday at 7.30pm prime time on Sirasa TV  . Since the second season commenced bit later than the first season, it starred with women presenters, Podi Nangi and Chooti Nangi. It was directed by Gaminda Priyaviraj, and written by both Priyaviraj and Chithrananda.  The show became the most popular on Sri Lanka at that time. The abbreviation for the show, "ala", means potato in the Sinhala language, a word which is also used to imply "failure" in a comic sense. The two presenters became famous through the show and became the two main players in Sri Lankan television comedy.

Early Days
Gaminda and Suneth joined Sirata tv as dubbing artist in 99-00 period even though they wanted to become a directer and a cameramen respectively. while they were working on Sirasa tv they also did some comedy sketches in Sirasa FM around 2002 and got the experience in both TV and Radio field. At that time Gaminda had an idea to direct a tv program and they got the approval from Sirasa TV creative director Nimal Lakshapathiarachchi. Initially it was planned to do with Mahendra Perera who looked similar to Gaminda at that time but Mahendra was in a tight schedule with his other work and finally Suneth became Gaminda's partner. They didn't have any studio to shoot the first few episode so they did it at one of their friend's house.

Characters

Main characters 
 Gaminda Priyaviraj as "Podi Malli"
 Suneth Chithrananda as "Chooty Malli"
 Janaka Ranasinghe as "Sudu Malli"
 Banura Malith Hettiarachchi as "Jaya Sri"

Other supporting characters 

 Athula Jayasingha
 Anura Jayantha
 Thusitha S Karawita
 Hileriyan Perera
 Ulapane Gunasekara ( d:2020)
 Shyamalee Livera
 Rochana Wimaladewa
 Sameera

References

External Links 
Api Nodanna Live On YouTube
Api Nodanna Live Facebook Group
Api Nodanna Live Facebook Page

 පොඩි මල්ලියි, චූටි මල්ලියි එක්ක
 Api Nodanna Live On Sirasa TV Website

Sri Lankan television shows
2000s Sri Lankan television series
2008 Sri Lankan television series debuts
Sirasa TV original programming